Frank Welsh may refer to:

 Frank Welsh (writer) (born 1931), writer on imperial British history
 Frank Welsh (politician) (1871–1959), Australian politician
 Frank S. Welsh (born 1950), president of the U.S.-based Welsh Color and Conservation, Inc.